The following outline is provided as an overview of and topical guide to Uzbekistan:

Uzbekistan – doubly landlocked sovereign country located in Central Asia.  Uzbekistan borders Kazakhstan to the west and to the north, Kyrgyzstan and Tajikistan to the east, and Afghanistan and Turkmenistan to the south.

General reference 

 Pronunciation:
 Common English country name:  Uzbekistan
 Official English country name:  The Republic of Uzbekistan
 Common endonym(s): O'zbekiston
 Official endonym(s): O‘zbekiston Respublikasi
 Adjectival(s): Uzbekistani, Uzbek
 Demonym(s): Uzbekistani, Uzbek
 International rankings of Uzbekistan
 ISO country codes:  UZ, UZB, 860
 ISO region codes:  See ISO 3166-2:UZ
 Internet country code top-level domain:  .uz

Geography of Uzbekistan 

Geography of Uzbekistan
 Uzbekistan is: a doubly landlocked country
 Location:
 Northern Hemisphere and Eastern Hemisphere
 Eurasia
 Asia
 Central Asia
 Time zone:  Uzbekistan Time (UTC+05)
 Extreme points of Uzbekistan
 High:  Khazret Sultan 
 Low:  Sariqamish Kuli 
 Land boundaries:  6,221 km
 2,203 km
 1,621 km
 1,161 km
 1,099 km
 137 km
 Coastline:  none
 Population of Uzbekistan: 27,372,000 – 44th most populous country
 Area of Uzbekistan: 447,400 km² – 56th in the world by area
 Atlas of Uzbekistan

Environment of Uzbekistan 

 Climate of Uzbekistan
 Wildlife of Uzbekistan
 Fauna of Uzbekistan
 Birds of Uzbekistan
 Mammals of Uzbekistan

Natural geographic features of Uzbekistan 

 Glaciers of Uzbekistan: None
 Islands of Uzbekistan: None
 Lakes of Uzbekistan
 Mountains of Uzbekistan
 Volcanoes in Uzbekistan: None
 Rivers of Uzbekistan
 List of World Heritage Sites in Uzbekistan

Regions of Uzbekistan 

Regions of Uzbekistan

Ecoregions of Uzbekistan 

List of ecoregions in Uzbekistan

Administrative divisions of Uzbekistan 

Administrative divisions of Uzbekistan
 Regions of Uzbekistan
 Districts of Uzbekistan

Regions of Uzbekistan 

Regions of Uzbekistan

The regions are keyed to the map. The names are given in Uzbek with standard phonetic transcription in parentheses.
02 Andijon (Andijan)
03 Buxoro (Bukhara)
04 Farg'ona (Fergana)
05 Jizzax (Jizzakh)
06 Namangan (Namangan)
07 Navoiy (Navoiy)
08 Qashqadaryo (Kashkadarya)
09 Samarqand (Samarkand)
10 Sirdaryo (Syrdarya)
11 Surxondaryo (Surkhandarya)
12 Toshkent (Tashkent)
13 Xorazm (Khorezm)
14 Qaraqalpaqstan Respublikasi (Karakalpakstan)
01 Tashkent (city)

Districts of Uzbekistan 

Districts of Uzbekistan

Demography of Uzbekistan 

Demographics of Uzbekistan

Government and politics of Uzbekistan 

Politics of Uzbekistan
 Form of government: Presidential republic
 Capital of Uzbekistan: Tashkent
 Elections in Uzbekistan
 Political parties in Uzbekistan

Branches of the government of Uzbekistan 

Government of Uzbekistan

Executive branch of the government of Uzbekistan 
 Head of state: President of Uzbekistan, Shavkat Mirziyoyev (in office since November 2016)
 Head of government: Prime Minister of Uzbekistan, Abdulla Aripov (appointed in December 2016)
 Cabinet of Uzbekistan

Legislative branch of the government of Uzbekistan 

 Parliament of Uzbekistan (bicameral)
 Upper house: Senate of Uzbekistan
 Lower house: House of Commons of Uzbekistan

Judicial branch of the government of Uzbekistan 

Court system of Uzbekistan
 Supreme Court of Uzbekistan

Foreign relations of Uzbekistan 

Foreign relations of Uzbekistan
 Diplomatic missions in Uzbekistan
 Diplomatic missions of Uzbekistan

International organization membership 

International organization membership of Uzbekistan
The Republic of Uzbekistan is a member of:

Asian Development Bank (ADB)
Collective Security Treaty Organization (CSTO)
Commonwealth of Independent States (CIS)
Economic Cooperation Organization (ECO)
Eurasian Economic Community (EAEC)
Euro-Atlantic Partnership Council (EAPC)
European Bank for Reconstruction and Development (EBRD)
Food and Agriculture Organization (FAO)
General Confederation of Trade Unions (GCTU)
International Atomic Energy Agency (IAEA)
International Bank for Reconstruction and Development (IBRD)
International Civil Aviation Organization (ICAO)
International Criminal Court (ICCt) (signatory)
International Criminal Police Organization (Interpol)
International Development Association (IDA)
International Federation of Red Cross and Red Crescent Societies (IFRCS)
International Finance Corporation (IFC)
International Labour Organization (ILO)
International Monetary Fund (IMF)
International Olympic Committee (IOC)
International Organization for Standardization (ISO)
International Red Cross and Red Crescent Movement (ICRM)

International Telecommunication Union (ITU)
International Telecommunications Satellite Organization (ITSO)
Islamic Development Bank (IDB)
Multilateral Investment Guarantee Agency (MIGA)
Nonaligned Movement (NAM)
Organisation of Islamic Cooperation (OIC)
Organization for Security and Cooperation in Europe (OSCE)
Organisation for the Prohibition of Chemical Weapons (OPCW)
Partnership for Peace (PFP)
Shanghai Cooperation Organisation (SCO)
United Nations (UN)
United Nations Conference on Trade and Development (UNCTAD)
United Nations Educational, Scientific, and Cultural Organization (UNESCO)
United Nations Industrial Development Organization (UNIDO)
Universal Postal Union (UPU)
World Customs Organization (WCO)
World Federation of Trade Unions (WFTU)
World Health Organization (WHO)
World Intellectual Property Organization (WIPO)
World Meteorological Organization (WMO)
World Tourism Organization (UNWTO)
World Trade Organization (WTO) (observer)

Law and order in Uzbekistan 

Law of Uzbekistan
 Constitution of Uzbekistan
 Human rights in Uzbekistan
 LGBT rights in Uzbekistan
 Freedom of religion in Uzbekistan
 Law enforcement in Uzbekistan

Military of Uzbekistan 

Military of Uzbekistan
 Command
 Commander-in-chief:
 Ministry of Defence of Uzbekistan
 Forces
 Army of Uzbekistan
 Navy of Uzbekistan: None
 Air Force of Uzbekistan
 Military history of Uzbekistan

Local government in Uzbekistan 

Local government in Uzbekistan

History of Uzbekistan 

History of Uzbekistan
 Timeline of the history of Uzbekistan
 Current events of Uzbekistan
 Military history of Uzbekistan

Culture of Uzbekistan 

Culture of Uzbekistan
 Architecture of Uzbekistan
Modern architecture in Uzbekistan
 Cuisine of Uzbekistan
 List of Uzbek dishes
 Languages of Uzbekistan
 Media in Uzbekistan
 National symbols of Uzbekistan
 Coat of arms of Uzbekistan
 Flag of Uzbekistan
 National anthem of Uzbekistan
 People of Uzbekistan
 Prostitution in Uzbekistan
 Public holidays in Uzbekistan
 Religion in Uzbekistan
 Buddhism in Uzbekistan
 Christianity in Uzbekistan
 Islam in Uzbekistan
 Judaism in Uzbekistan
 List of World Heritage Sites in Uzbekistan

Art in Uzbekistan 
 Cinema of Uzbekistan
 Music of Uzbekistan

Sports in Uzbekistan 

Sports in Uzbekistan
 Football in Uzbekistan
 Uzbekistan at the Olympics

Economy and infrastructure of Uzbekistan 

Economy of Uzbekistan
 Economic rank, by nominal GDP (2007): 87th (eighty-seventh)
 Agriculture in Uzbekistan
 Banking in Uzbekistan
 National Bank of Uzbekistan
 Communications in Uzbekistan
 Internet in Uzbekistan
 Companies of Uzbekistan
Currency of Uzbekistan: Soum
ISO 4217: UZS
 Energy in Uzbekistan
 Energy policy of Uzbekistan
 Oil industry in Uzbekistan
 Health care in Uzbekistan
 Mining in Uzbekistan
 Uzbekistan Stock Exchange
 Tourism in Uzbekistan
 Transportation in Uzbekistan
 Airports in Uzbekistan
 Rail transport in Uzbekistan

Education in Uzbekistan 

Education in Uzbekistan

Health in Uzbekistan 

Health in Uzbekistan

See also 

Uzbekistan
List of international rankings
List of Uzbekistan-related topics
Member state of the United Nations
Outline of Asia
Outline of geography

References

External links 

 Government of Uzbekistan
 Lower House of Uzbekistan parliament
 Upper House of Uzbekistan parliament
 
 Library of Congress – A Country Study: Uzbekistan
 Photos of Uzbekistan

Uzbekistan
 1